The 1929 Ohio State Buckeyes football team represented Ohio State University in the 1929 college football season. In Sam Willaman's first season as head coach, the Buckeyes beat Michigan. The Buckeyes compiled a 4–3–1 record while outscoring opponents 95–69.

Schedule

Coaching staff
 Sam Willaman, head coach, first year

References

Ohio State
Ohio State Buckeyes football seasons
Ohio State Buckeyes football